Oscar Barrientos (born July 16, 1943 Occidental Mindoro, Philippines) is a retired Philippine Regional Trial Court judge. He has been an executive vice president of and spokesman for Mighty Corporation since November 2013.

Career
Barrientos is a qualified lawyer and a certified public accountant; he was admitted to the Philippine Bar on March 9, 1971. He graduated from Far Eastern University in Manila with a double major in commerce and law. He later earned a master's degree at the Asian Institute of Management.

Barrientos is a businessman, professor, and lawyer, with experience in corporate law, financial management, and managerial accounting. He was appointed judge of Malolos Regional Trial Court (Branch 82) in 1995. Barrientos retired from the bench and took a leave from teaching in late 2012.

References

1943 births
21st-century Filipino businesspeople
Filipino judges
Living people
People from Occidental Mindoro
Pamantasan ng Lungsod ng Maynila alumni
Asian Institute of Management alumni